"I'll Never Find Another You" is a 1964 single by The Seekers, which reached No. 1 in the United Kingdom in February 1965. It was The Seekers' first UK-released single, and it was the second-best-selling of 1965 in the UK. The song was also popular in the United States, reaching peaks of No. 4 pop and No. 2 easy listening on the Billboard Hot 100 charts.

The track was written and produced by Tom Springfield, who was also responsible for most of The Seekers' subsequent hits.

It received a 1967 US revival as a country music No. 1 by Sonny James.

In July 2018, the tune was featured in a Westpac bank TV advertisement in Australia, covered by Julia Jacklin.

The song was added to the National Film and Sound Archive of Australia's Sounds of Australia registry in 2011.

Chart performance

The Seekers

Sonny James

See also
 List of best-selling singles of the 1960s in the United Kingdom

References

UK Singles Chart number-one singles
Number-one singles in Australia
1964 singles
1965 singles
Songs written by Tom Springfield
1967 singles
Sonny James songs
Capitol Records singles
1964 songs
Columbia Graphophone Company singles